Michael Ahmed Stone (born February 13, 1978) is a former American football safety.  Stone was most recently a member of the New York Giants in the National Football League.  He was originally drafted by the Arizona Cardinals in the second round (54th overall) of the 2001 NFL Draft. He played college football at Memphis.  He graduated with honors from the University of Memphis with a degree in Architecture.

High school career
Stone attended Southfield-Lathrup High School in Southfield, Michigan, where he lettered in football and track.

References

External links
Stats at NFL.com

1978 births
Living people
Sportspeople from Southfield, Michigan
American football safeties
Central State Marauders football players
Memphis Tigers football players
Arizona Cardinals players
New England Patriots players
Houston Texans players
New York Giants players